The York-Skinner House is a historic house located at Westfield in Chautauqua County, New York, United States. It is a -story wood-frame Gothic Revival-style dwelling built in 1866. The current structure incorporated an earlier dwelling built before 1833.

It was listed on the National Register of Historic Places in 1983.

References

Houses on the National Register of Historic Places in New York (state)
Carpenter Gothic houses in New York (state)
Houses completed in 1866
Houses in Chautauqua County, New York
1866 establishments in New York (state)
National Register of Historic Places in Chautauqua County, New York